Bloodstrike is a fictional team of action/adventure super agents, originally published by Rob Liefeld's Extreme Studios of Image Comics in the 1990s.

Bloodstrike is a top-secret, super-powered assassination squad deployed covertly by the United States government. All of the members had already died before becoming members of the team, and were brought back to life by the government's Project: Born Again.

Publication history
Bloodstrike #1 was cover dated April 1993 and the series ran for 22 issues. There was a special issue 25 printed (after issue 10) as part of the "Images of Tomorrow" event that ran through several titles being published by Image at the time. During issue 25, the Bloodstrike title changed dramatically as Bloodstrike became the name of a solo agent. Extreme Studios boasted that the issue depicted precisely where the series would be at the end of issue 24, but issues 23 and 24 were never produced. It was later revealed that Cabbot Stone was the masked individual named Bloodstrike.

After the Bloodstrike series concluded, a sequel titled Bloodstrike: Assassin ran for three issues (plus an issue #0) featuring art by Karl Altstaetter. The character of Bloodstrike returned once again in Cabbot: Bloodhunter. Only the first issue was printed, though parts 2 and 3 were printed as backup stories in the pages of Supreme.

After an 18-year hiatus, Bloodstrike issue 26 was released in March 2012. It was written by Tim Seeley with art by Francesco Gaston. The series continued to follow Cabbot and his exploits with the company, but took on a more satirical tone as it examined the moral implications of bringing back the dead rather than focusing only on the action as it did in its previous run. It has been on hiatus since issue 33. The title will begin publication again in 2018, written and illustrated by Michel Fiffe.

Fictional team history
Bloodstrike follows an elite team of Government Operatives who were killed in action but resurrected by military scientists. The team members all require ongoing treatment sessions to stay alive and are thus unable to ever leave the project or opt against participating in a mission.

The main character and team leader was Cabbot Stone, brother of ex-Youngblood member and Brigade member Battlestone. Other members include the four-armed combat expert Fourplay, the savage ex-villain Deadlock, the power-armored Shogun and the enigmatic Tag, who could force people to "freeze in place" by touching them. The computer in charge of teleporting the team was named Roam, who had to re-charge its cells after each transport. In the first issue, the team is sent to a G.A.T.E. (Genetic and Technological Engineering) facility and battle and kill Commander Corben, who hired them to prove his facility is worthy.

At one point the government added the recently diagnosed HIV-positive character of Chapel to the roster, making him the only living member of the team. This membership would prove to be short lived. It was through Bloodstrike's access to classified government files that Chapel learns that the undead vigilante Spawn was really his former friend Al Simmons, who had been murdered by Chapel himself but has returned from the dead. Shortly after this revelation, Chapel kills himself in an attempt to gain power in death by bargaining with Hell's leadership, as Spawn had done.

Eventually the team's government supervisor, Noble, was revealed to be a member of The Covenant of the Sword, a villainous cyborg conspiracy. Noble's exposure (and death) resulted in the demise of all of Bloodstrike's members except for Cabbot. His memory was erased and he was renamed Bloodstrike as the comic became a solo (rather than team) book. However, it was revealed in issues 19 and 20 that the rest of Bloodstrike had been revived yet again, but this time as fully living beings due to being restored to life through Nu-Gene radiation therapy.

Proposed film adaptation
On August 20, 2012, Liefeld was set to produce a Bloodstrike film
adaptation with Adi Shankar's 1984 Private Defense Contractors and Brooklyn Weaver's Energy Entertainment. There has been no further information since.

See also
List of Image Comics publications

References

External links

Image Comics superhero teams
Extreme Studios titles
1993 comics debuts
Characters created by Rob Liefeld
Comics characters introduced in 1993